George Nye may refer to:

 George D. Nye (1898–1969), American politician of the Democratic party
 G. Raymond Nye (1889–1965), American actor